Las Vegas Garden of Love is a reality television series that aired on ABC Family for 10 episodes during the summer of 2005. It was not given a real ending or a second season, due to very low ratings. It was re-run until Fall of 2005.

External links
 

2000s American reality television series
2005 American television series debuts
2005 American television series endings
ABC Family original programming
Television shows set in the Las Vegas Valley